Side Hustles is the second compilation album by American Southern hip hop duo UGK. It was released on September 24, 2002, via Jive Records. Production was handled by Barry Adams, Byrd, Colin Wolfe, Franklin "Livin' Proof" Crum, Gavin "Pretty Boy" Marchand, Melvin Coleman, Organized Noize, Scarface, Studio Ton, Ty Fyffe and Pimp C. It features guest appearances from Mil, Too $hort, 8Ball, B-Legit, Celly Cel, E-40, K.B., Marquaze, Q, Rob Jackson, Scarface, Sonji Mickey and Young Smitty. The album peaked at number 70 on the Billboard 200 and number 10 on the Top R&B/Hip-Hop Albums in the United States.

Critical reception

Track listing

Charts

References

External links

UGK albums
2002 compilation albums
Albums produced by Ty Fyffe
Albums produced by Studio Ton
Gangsta rap compilation albums
Jive Records compilation albums
Albums produced by Organized Noize